Suruh, was a Palestinian Arab hamlet, located  northeast of Acre. It became depopulated in the 1948 Arab-Israeli war.

History
Suruh contained two khirbats ("sites of ruins") with a variety of ancient artifacts, including cisterns, and rock-hewn tombs.

Ottoman era
An 1875 visitor, Victor Guérin, describes it as a ruin, which he called Khurbet Seroueh. Guérin noted; "These ruins cover the summit of the hill. At the highest point we observed the remains of a very ancient square tower, measuring fourteen paces on each side, the lower courses consisting of very large blocks, roughly squared and without cement. The interior is full of similar blocks, piled up in confusion, in the midst of which terebinths and pomegranates have taken root. Near this tower a few old houses served as an asylum to four families of Metawileh. On the lintel of the door of one of these houses a square cross inscribed in a circle can still be traced. The terraces of another house are supported in the interior by arched arcades in good cut stone of Roman, or at least Byzantine, date. There are also the remains of numerous houses which have been destroyed, a dozen cisterns cut in the rock, a column lying on the ground, and the fragment of a sarcophagus."

In 1881, the PEF's Survey of Western Palestine (SWP)  described  Suruh as "a small village, containing about ninety Moslems, situated on a ridge, with olives and arable land round; there are three rock-cut cisterns. The residents  lived by agriculture and raising live-stock.

British Mandate era
In the 1945 statistics  the population Tarbikha, Al-Nabi Rubin and Suruh together was 1000 Muslims,  and they  had a total of 18,563  dunams of land.  619  dunams were plantations and irrigable land, 3,204 used for cereals, while 112 dunams were built-up (urban) land.

1948, and aftermath
During the 1948 Arab-Israeli war, the inhabitants of Suruh, the neighbouring hamlet of Nabi Rubin and the main village of Tarbikha, were given expulsion orders by Israeli forces. A predominantly Sunni Muslim hamlet, Suruh and Nabi Rubin were satellite hamlets of Tarbikha, a largely Shi'ite village. Most of Suruh's inhabitants and those the neighbouring localities ended up leaving to Lebanon.

In 1992 the village site was described: "Only rubble, trees, cactuses, shrubs, and weeds are visible. Most of the site is used for grazing."

See also
Depopulated Palestinian locations in Israel

References

Bibliography

External links
Welcome To Suruh
Suruh, Zochrot
Survey of Western Palestine, Map 3:  IAA, Wikimedia commons 
Suruh, at Khalil Sakakini Cultural Center

District of Acre
Arab villages depopulated during the 1948 Arab–Israeli War
1948 disestablishments in Israel